The 2018 Kirklees Metropolitan Borough Council election took place on 3 May 2018 to elect members of Kirklees Metropolitan Borough Council in England. This was on the same day as other local elections in England. The result gave the Labour Party majority control of Kirklees Council with 36 of the 69  councillors representing the party.

Votes by Party 
Labour Party: 49,733 votes

Conservative Party: 35,847

Liberal Democrats: 14,116

Green Party: 8,441

Independents: 3,502

TUSC: 986

UKIP: 411

Democrats and Veterans: 317

Pirate Party: 64

Yorkshire Party: 56

Candidates

Almondbury ward

Ashbrow ward

Batley East ward

Batley West ward

Birstall and Birkenshaw ward

Cleckheaton ward

Colne Valley ward

Crosland Moor and Netherton ward

Dalton ward

Denby Dale ward

Dewsbury East ward

Dewsbury South ward

Dewsbury West ward

Golcar ward

Greenhead ward

Heckmondwike ward

Holme Valley North ward

Holme Valley South ward

Kirkburton ward

Lindley ward

Liversedge and Gomersal ward

Mirfield ward

Newsome ward

References

2018 English local elections
2018
2010s in West Yorkshire